Eschenau im Hausruckkreis is a municipality in the district of Grieskirchen in the Austrian state of Upper Austria.

Geography
Eschenau lies in the Hausruckviertel. About 22 percent of the municipality is forest, and 71 percent is farmland.

References

Cities and towns in Grieskirchen District
Sauwald